Minuartia rubella is a species of flowering plant in the family Caryophyllaceae known by several common names, including beautiful sandwort, mountain sandwort, Arctic sandwort, and boreal stitchwort. It has a circumboreal distribution, occurring throughout the northernmost Northern Hemisphere from the Arctic Circle on the Arctic tundra into the alpine climates of mountainous areas in temperate Eurasia and North America. It grows in rocky, moist, often barren habitat, including gravelly, sparsely vegetated slopes with little organic matter. It is a calciphile, growing in calcareous substrates such as soils rich in decomposed limestone.

This is a small, mat-forming perennial herb growing in a low, tight clump of hairy, glandular herbage. The green, three-veined leaves are needlelike or flattened, no more than a centimeter long and a millimeter wide. The plant blooms in summer with tiny flowers made up of pointed sepals under 4 millimeters long and five white petals roughly the same length or slightly smaller.

References

External links

Jepson Manual Treatment
Photo gallery

rubella
Alpine flora
Flora of Canada
Flora of the Western United States
Flora of Alaska
Flora of California
Flora of the Sierra Nevada (United States)
Flora of Norway
Flora of Finland
Flora of Sweden
Plants described in 1812
Flora without expected TNC conservation status